Txiki (Basque, 'small' or 'youngster') is used as a nickname. Notable people with the nickname include:

People
Txiki (footballer, born 1977), Daniel Rodríguez Pérez, a Spanish footballer
Txiki (footballer, born 1979), Cristian Urbistondo López, a Spanish footballer
Txiki Begiristain (born 1964), a Spanish footballer
Indalecio Sarasqueta (1860–1900), known as Txikito de Eibar or Aizpiri txiki, a Basque pelota player
Lazkao Txiki (1926–1993), a Basque bertsolari poet and musician
José María Benegas (1948–2015), a Spanish politician
José Larrañaga Arenas (1926–1984), a Spanish politician

Mythology
San Martin Txiki, trickster in Basque mythology

See also
Aitz Txiki, a Basque mountain peak

Basque masculine given names